In Tennessee, U.S. Route 412 (US 412) stretches for  through the farmland of West Tennessee and the hills of Middle Tennessee, starting at the Missouri state line (on I-155 at the Mississippi River) near Dyersburg and running to an interchange between I-65 and SR 99 in Columbia.

Route description

Dyer County

US 412 enters West Tennessee, concurrent with I-155, on the Caruthersville Bridge over the Mississippi River. They head east through rural areas to have interchanges with SR 181 (Exit 2) and SR 182 (Exit 7), as well as crossing a bridge over the Obion River. I-155/US 412 then cross the Chickasaw Bluffs into Dyersburg, where they pass along the northern edge of the city and have an interchange with SR 78 (Exit 13). The interstate comes to an end shortly thereafter at an interchange with US 51 (SR 3/Exit 15), where US 412 turns south along US 51. US 51 splits off not even a mile later at an interchange with SR 211, and US 412 continues south along four-lane Freeway, concurrent with unsigned SR 20. US 412/SR 20 have an interchange with SR 104, where it downgrades to a 4-lane expressway just before crossing the North Fork of the Forked Deer River and leaving Dyersburg. They then curve to the southeast as they pass through Bonicord and have a diamond interchange with SR 210. US 412/SR 20 continue southeast and cross into Crockett County.

Crockett County

US 412/SR 20 continue through farmland to the town of Friendship, to have a RIRO interchange with SR 189. They continue southeast to pass through Cairo and have a Quadrant interchange with SR 152 just before entering Alamo. US 412/SR 20 then have a parclo interchange with SR 188 before having a partial interchange with N Cavalier Drive (Old US 412/SR 20 and starting on a bypass around the west side of town. They then have a diamond interchange with SR 54/SR 88 before passing just west of downtown and then having a partial interchange with S Cavalier Drive (Old US 412/SR 20). US 412/SR 20 then leave Alamo and continue southeast through farmland and have a Quadrant interchange with SR 88 before entering Bells and coming to a Cloverleaf interchange with US 70A/US 79/SR 76, just after bypassing downtown to the northern and eastern sides. It then has a parclo interchange with the eastern end of SR 88 before leaving Bells and continuing southeast through farmland to cross into Madison County.

Madison County

The highway then enters some hills before entering Jackson and coming to a diamond interchange with Country Club Lane, about a mile from its parclo interchange with I-40 (Exit 79). At I-40, SR 20 remains hidden and follows US 412 Bus through the city while US 412 is overlapped with Interstate 40 between Exit 79 and Exit 87. I-40/US 412 head east along the north side of the city, having interchanges with US 45 Bypass (SR 186/Exit 80), US 45 (SR 5/Exit 82), Campbell Street (Exit 83), and Christmasville Road/Dr. F.E. Wright Drive (Exit 85), before coming to an interchange with US 70 (SR 1/Exit 87), where US 412 splits off from I-40 and turns southwest along US 70. US 412 then splits and turns east at the eastern end of US 412 Bus, and US 412 becomes concurrent with SR 20 again as they leave Jackson as a two-lane highway. US 412/SR 20 continue east through farmland to the community of Springbrook, where it widens to a 4-lane divided highway and has an intersection with SR 152 just before crossing into Henderson County.

Henderson County

US 412/SR 20 continue east through countryside and farmland and pass through Crucifer before narrowing to a 4-lane undivided shortly before entering Lexington. They then pass by several businesses and becomes concurrent with SR 104 before crossing over the Beech River, passing just south of the dam for Beech Lake. The highway continues past several more businesses before entering downtown and coming to an intersection with SR 22, where SR 104 splits off and goes southeast. US 412/SR 20 continues through some neighborhoods before leaving Lexington and continuing east through farmland and countryside as a 4-lane divided highway. The highway then narrows to a 4-lane undivided highway before passing through the communities of Chesterfield, where it has an intersection with SR 114, and Darden. The highway then crosses into Decatur County.

Decatur County

US 412/SR 20 then have an intersection with SR 202 before continuing east and entering Parsons. They pass by a neighborhood before narrowing to 2-lanes and entering downtown, where it has an intersection with US 641/SR 69. They continue through downtown before leaving Parsons as a 2-lane highway. US 412/SR 20 continue through largely wooded countryside before coming to Perryville and becoming concurrent with SR 100, just before crossing a bridge over the Tennessee River and entering Perry County and Middle Tennessee.

Perry County

The highway has an intersection SR 438 just south of Mousetail Landing State Park before passing through some hills before entering Linden. They pass through downtown before having an intersection with SR 13. The highway then leaves Linden after crossing a bridge over the Buffalo River and continues east to the community of Chestnut Grove, where SR 100 splits off at a Y-Intersection and goes northeast. They then pass through hilly and wooded areas as they cross into Lewis County.

Lewis County

US 412/SR 20 continues east through hilly and wooded terrain to enter farmland, just before entering the town of Hohenwald. The highway passes by some homes and businesses before entering downtown and coming to an intersection with SR 48 and SR 99, where SR 20 leaves US 412 and becomes signed for the first time while SR 99 becomes unsigned and joins US 412. US 412/SR 99 go east as a 4-lane undivided highway to leave downtown and continue east through a major business district before leaving Hohenwald and entering wooded areas, where it widens to a divided highway. The highway continues northeast through wooded areas before entering farmland, shortly before downgrading to an undivided highway, entering Gordonsburg, and having an interchange with the Natchez Trace Parkway. US 412/SR 99 then narrow to 2-lanes and continue through wooded and hilly to cross into Maury County.

Maury County

US 412/SR 99 continue east through farmland and pass through the community of Hampshire, where it has an intersection with SR 166. The highway continues east through farmland before entering the city of Columbia, where SR 99 separates from US 412 at an interchange with US 43/SR 6, where US 412 follows that highway while SR 99 continues into town concurrent with US 412 Bus. They bypass Columbia along the western and northern sides as a four-lane divided highway, having interchanges with SR 50, Industrial Park Road, and SR 7, before crossing the Duck River and arriving at an intersection US 31/US 412 Bus (SR 99), where US 43 and US 412 Bus ends, SR 6 heads north along US 31, and SR 99 rejoins US 412. US 412/SR 99 then narrows to 2-lanes and continues east to leave the city, though it is still within the city limits, and go through farmland to eventually come to an interchange with I-65 (Exit 46), where US 412 ends and SR 99 becomes signed as a primary highway as it leaves Columbia and continues east.

Major intersections

References

412
Transportation in Dyer County, Tennessee
Transportation in Crockett County, Tennessee
Transportation in Madison County, Tennessee
Transportation in Henderson County, Tennessee
Transportation in Decatur County, Tennessee
Transportation in Perry County, Tennessee
Transportation in Lewis County, Tennessee
Transportation in Maury County, Tennessee
Freeways in Tennessee
 Tennessee